Juan Aldama is a city in the northwestern portion of the Mexican state of Zacatecas. It is the biggest community in the Municipality of Juan Aldama and the seat of the municipal government.

It was renamed for insurgent Juan Aldama. It had previously been known as San Juan Bautista del Mezquital and Villa Aréchiga.

Juan Aldama is surrounded by small towns such as Ojitos, Jalpa, Cienega more known as general Juan Jose Rios, Las Norias, Corrales and Paradillas and many more

Population
Population: about 20,000.
Death rate: 150 people yearly.
Newborn rate: 500 babies yearly.

Climate

Economy
Technology/Communication/Media: Internet, Telephone, and Fax.
Juan Aldama's main source of economy is based on trade and cultivation of corn and beans.

Entertainment
Juan Aldama's center of entertainment is Minarturs discothèque and the Alameda located at the south side of the main plaza.

References

External links 
wikiJAZ Juan Aldama Zacatecas General Interest wiki 

Populated places in Zacatecas